Mark Gregory Beer OBE is a British lawyer and businessman who is co-founder of Kazakhstan law firm Seven Pillars Law, as well as chairman of The Metis Institute, and co-founder of the University of Oxford's Deep Technology Dispute Resolution Lab. He is chair of the Board of Trustees of the Global Legal Action Network and was previously President of the International Association for Court Administration. Beer is a member of the Commercial Dispute Resolution Taskforce, part of the UK Government's ‘LawTech Delivery Panel’; senior advisor to Virtuzone; senior advisor to Emissary Holdings; advisor to the Board of Resolve Disputes Online; a member of the Innovation Working Group of the Task Force on Justice; a professional associate with Outer Temple Chambers; a member of the faculty at the Legal Technology and Innovation Institute and a member of the International Council of the Supreme Court of the Republic of Kazakhstan. Beer is the Chairman of the Astana Financial Centre's (AIFC) LegalTech Advisory Council and a member of the AIFC Legal Services Board. 

In 2021, Beer was appointed a professor of AI and Law by the Shanghai University of Political Science and Law, and has been appointed a member of the Shanghai Arbitration Commission.

Beer is a Visiting Fellow of the University of Oxford, a member of the World Economic Forum's Expert Network for the justice sector and a legal commentator on China's One Belt One Road Initiative.

Education 

Beer studied at both King Edward's School, Birmingham and Manchester Grammar School before graduating from University of Oxford in 1993 after studying jurisprudence. He went on to start his legal career with Edge & Ellison, Hatwell Pritchett & Co, Clyde & Co and Mastercard.

Career 
Beer was appointed Registrar at DIFC Courts in 2008, and a Small Claims Tribunal Judge and the Chief Executive of the DIFC Courts in 2009. Beer was Registrar at the Dubai World Tribunal from 2009 to 2018. In 2017, Beer was appointed Registrar General to the DIFC Courts by Chief Justice Michael Hwang. Beer was identified as one of the 100 Inspiring Leaders in the Middle East and was involved in a number of transformative projects in Dubai in the legal and justice sectors, having spoken about the future of law and justice and been instrumental in the establishment of the Courts of the Future Forum. 

Beer was involved in negotiating the memoranda signed with other courts including those in England and Wales, the Southern District of New York, Singapore, New South Wales and the Supreme Court of Kazakhstan.

Beer was co-Chief Executive and general registrar of the Dubai International Financial Centre (DIFC) Dispute Resolution Authority, which developed links with China, Kazakhstan, Abu Dhabi Judicial Department, Ras al-Khaimah, Microsoft, the Dubai Judicial Institute, and New York University Abu Dhabi,

Beer was behind the idea to create the DIFC's Dispute Resolution Authority, hosting the DIFC Courts, the DIFC-LCIA Arbitration Centre, the DIFC Wills and Probate Registry and the DIFC Academy of Law. Beer worked on the development of the Middle East's first specialist Technology and Construction Court.

As the Chief Executive of the DIFC Courts, Beer was credited by Chief Justice Michael Hwang as one of the reasons for the DIFC Courts' success.

Awards and recognition
Beer has twice been named in the 'Top 50 most influential Brits in the UAE' by ArabianBusiness.com. He is also listed as one of the 100 most influential people in Dubai and by Forbes Middle East as one of the top 50 most influential expats in the UAE. Beer was also named as one of the 100 Inspiring Leaders in the Middle East and has been described as having an ′incredibly sharp mind, a brilliant reputation and a proven talent for securing government support behind disruptive planning′.

Beer was awarded an OBE in Queen Elizabeth II's 2013 Birthday honours list, for his work in strengthening relations between the UK and the UAE. He has twice been shortlisted by the Law Society of England and Wales as the UK's Solicitor of the Year – In-House. In 2018, Beer was awarded The ACC Middle East Achievement Award for his work in developing Dubai's judicial system.

References

External links
BCAF
Outer Temple Chambers

Living people
1971 births
English lawyers
Alumni of the University of Oxford
Alumni of Lady Margaret Hall, Oxford
People educated at Manchester Grammar School
People educated at King Edward's School, Birmingham
People from Birmingham, West Midlands
Governors of Abingdon School